Samuel Breck (July 17, 1771August 31, 1862) was an American politician from Pennsylvania who served as a member of the U.S. House of Representatives for Pennsylvania's 1st congressional district from 1823 to 1825.

Life
Samuel Breck (brother of Daniel Breck) was born in Boston in the Province of Massachusetts Bay.  His parents were Samuel Breck and Hannah Andrews. His father was a wealthy merchant in Boston and the family mansion adjacent to Boston Common was often visited by foreign travelers.

He began his education at Boston Latin School. In 1783 Breck attended the Royal Military School of Loreze, France.  He completed his studies in France in 1787. Although he was somewhat drawn to Catholicism in France he remained an Episcopalian his whole life.

In 1790 his father gave him $10,000 to set up as a merchant on Boston's longwharf. He moved to Pennsylvania and settled in Philadelphia in 1792, where he engaged in business as a merchant.  He served as a corporal during the Whiskey Rebellion.  On December 24, 1795, he married Jean Ross, the daughter of a leading Philadelphia merchant. Besides his role in business he was also an essayist and orator. He founded a group called the Sons of New England.

Breck was a member of the Pennsylvania State Senate from 1817 to 1821. In February 1821, he was the lead sponsor of a law that would have immediately emancipated all enslaved persons living in Pennsylvania. When this failed, he sponsored another bill which would have amended the state's existing gradual abolition law. This bill failed as well. He returned to the state assembly as the senator for Pennsylvania's 2nd district from 1832 to 1834. He was elected as a member to the American Philosophical Society in 1838.

Breck was elected as an Adams-Clay Federalist to the Eighteenth Congress. He withdrew from active business pursuits and lived in retirement. In 1861 he spoke publicly at a meeting in Philadelphia urging the people to preserve the constitution he had been alive to help form.<ref>Dictionary of American Biography Vol. 2, p. 5</ref> His death occurred in Philadelphia in 1862.  Interment in St. Peter's Episcopal Churchyard in Philadelphia, Pennsylvania.

 Works 
 Sketch of the Internal Improvements Already Made by Pennsylvania: With Observations Upon Her Physical and Fiscal Means for Their Extension; Particularly as They Have Reference to the Future Growth and Prosperity of Philadelphia. M. Thomas, 1818.

Bibliography

Wainwright, Nicholas B. The Diary of Samuel Breck, 1814–1835, 1838.'' Pennsylvania Magazine of History and Biography 102 (October 1978): 469–508; 103 (1979): 85-113, 222–51, 356–82.

Notes

References

The Political Graveyard

External links
 The Samuel Breck Papers, including correspondence, diaries, manuscripts, travel logs and other materials, are available for research use at the Historical Society of Pennsylvania.

1771 births
1862 deaths
Politicians from Boston
People from colonial Boston
American people of English descent
Federalist Party members of the United States House of Representatives from Pennsylvania
Members of the Pennsylvania House of Representatives
Pennsylvania state senators
Politicians from Philadelphia
19th-century American politicians
American expatriates in France
Military personnel from Pennsylvania
Burials at St. Peter's churchyard, Philadelphia